Osama Jabbar Shafeeq Rashid (born 17 January 1992) is an Iraqi professional footballer who plays as a midfielder for Primeira Liga club Vizela and the Iraq national team.

Club career

Youth career
Born in Kirkuk, Iraq, Rashid joined Feyenoord in 1999 from ZOB, an amateur club from Zuidoostbeemster. He spent more than a decade with the youth setup of the club and was part of one of the most promising crops of players to ever graduate from the academy in recent years. Other graduates included Stefan de Vrij, Jordy Clasie, Bruno Martins Indi, and Luc Castaignos amongst others. Rashid suffered an Injury in the 2009 UEFA European Under-17 Championship which prevented him from training with the first which he believes affected his chances with the first team. Rashid was not offered a professional contract once he turned 18 years old and therefore did not continue his career with Feyenoord.

Den Bosch and failed transfer to Werder Bremen
Rashid signed for FC Den Bosch following his release from Feyenoord. He played the 2011–12 season in the Eerste Divisie, the second division of professional football in the Netherlands. He played 12 times scoring twice while Den Bosch finished sixth in the league and failed to qualify to the Eredivisie. Rashid left Den Bosch at the end of the season.

In 2012, Wolfgang Sidka, a former Werder Bremen player who was coach of Iraq at the time, arranged a trial for Rashid at the Bundesliga club. He was invited for another trial and was ultimately offered a contract by Werder Bremen, which he turned down citing his desire to finish his studies. Rashid has since stated that negotiations between Feyenoord and Werder Bremen had failed even though Feyenoord were not entitled to financial compensation.

Excelsior Maassluis
Looking for more game time, Rashid signed for third tier side Excelsior Maassluis for the 2012–13 season. He played 20 times scoring five goals in the league.

Alphense Boys
In 2013, Rashid signed for Alphense Boys in the fifth tier of Dutch football. Having played 34 matches in which he scored 15 goals, he left the club at the end of the 2014–15 season to join SC Farense in Portugal.

Farense
Rashid signed for S.C. Farense in the second-highest Portuguese division. He made his debut on 8 August 2015 against Académico Viseu. He scored his first goal against Covilhã on matchday 7. Rashid was a regular in the team making league 41 appearances, scoring 6 times. He then received an offer from Bulgaria, allowing him to play in a top division of a country for the first time in his career.

Lokomotiv Plovdiv
Rashid finally got his share of top flight football after signing for Bulgarian side Lokomotiv Plovdiv. He made his debut as a late substitute against Slavia Sofia on matchday 3. Rashid left Bulgaria quickly as he failed to adjust to life there and returned to Portugal joining C.D. Santa Clara.

Santa Clara
Rashid's signing was announced by LigaPro side Santa Clara on 24 January 2017. He made his debut for Santa Clara as a second-half substitute in a match versus Gil Vicente on 12 February. He had his first start on three days later in 2–0 win against Cova Piedade and scored his first goal. The team finished the season in 10th position, missing out on promotion.

At the start of the following season, Rashid scored in his first matches of the season in both the cup and the league. He then scored three more goals in the following three games, to start the season scoring in each of the first four league games. He registered his first assist on 9 September against CF União Madeira in his team's 2–1 win. Rashid was injured in January and it took him almost three months to recover, he returned to action against CD Nacional, assisting twice in a 3–3 draw. Rashid then scored in the next two games, against Famalicão and Oliveirense to help Santa Clara win promotion and reach Primeira Liga.

In his first season in the Portuguese top flight. Osama scored three and assisted another three in his first six games of the season. He started the first 14 games playing as a left, centre, or defensive midfielder. He missed the next four games on international duty at the 2019 Asian Cup, in which Iraq was knocked out in the round of sixteen by eventual champions Qatar. On the matchday 21 fixture against Boavista Osama ruptured his knee ligament and was subbed off in the 31st minute. He missed five games due to injury, before returning as a second-half substitute against Vitória Guimarães. He ended the domestic season with 25 games, 7 goals, and six assists while Santa Clara finished in 10th place with 42 points.

Gaziantep 
On 23 January 2021, Rashid signed with Turkish club Gaziantep.

Khor Fakkan 
On 8 June 2021, Rashid signed with UAE club Khor Fakkan.

International career

Netherlands U-17
Having moved to the Netherlands as a child, Rashid was eligible and played for the Netherlands U17 team representing them 11 times. He was part of the squad that played the 2009 UEFA European Under-17 Championship reaching the final of the tournament which was lost to Germany. Rashid made two appearances for the dutch U19 team.

Iraq national team
Rashid switched allegiance to his birth country of Iraq, when the national team was managed by former Brazilian footballer Zico, and made his debut in a 6–0 defeat to Brazil. He was called up to the 2015 AFC Asian Cup in Australia where Iraq finished 4th.

Rashid was mainly overlooked in the following four years, making sporadic appearances as Iraq went through six managers in four years. Nonetheless, Iraq's manager Srečko Katanec brought Rashid back to the team for the 2019 Asian Cup. He played a disappointing 45 minutes in Iraq's first game, a 3–2 win against Vietnam, and did not feature the rest of the tournament as Iraq were knocked out in the round of 16 by eventual champions Qatar.

Personal life
Osama has a degree in Sports Marketing, and is a fan of Spanish club Real Madrid.

Career statistics

Honours

International
WAFF Championship runner-up: 2012

References

External links
 
 

1992 births
Living people
People from Kirkuk
Dutch people of Iraqi descent
Iraqi footballers
Dutch footballers
Association football midfielders
Iraq international footballers
Netherlands youth international footballers
2015 AFC Asian Cup players
2019 AFC Asian Cup players
Eredivisie players
Eerste Divisie players
Liga Portugal 2 players
First Professional Football League (Bulgaria) players
Primeira Liga players
Süper Lig players
UAE Pro League players
Feyenoord players
FC Den Bosch players
Excelsior Maassluis players
Alphense Boys players
S.C. Farense players
PFC Lokomotiv Plovdiv players
C.D. Santa Clara players
Gaziantep F.K. footballers
Khor Fakkan Sports Club players
F.C. Vizela players
Iraqi expatriate footballers
Iraqi expatriate sportspeople in Portugal
Expatriate footballers in Portugal
Iraqi expatriate sportspeople in Bulgaria
Expatriate footballers in Bulgaria
Iraqi expatriate sportspeople in Turkey
Expatriate footballers in Turkey
Iraqi expatriate sportspeople in the United Arab Emirates
Expatriate footballers in the United Arab Emirates